Frazer Simpson Frederick Hines (born 22 September 1944) is an English actor. He began his career as a child actor and appeared in A King in New York (1957) with Charlie Chaplin. He later played Jamie McCrimmon in Doctor Who, appearing in 117 episodes of the series, more than any other companion. He was a regular in the series alongside Patrick Troughton as the Second Doctor between 1966 and 1969, and made guest appearances in the 1980s stories The Five Doctors and The Two Doctors. He also had a long-running role as Joe Sugden in Emmerdale Farm between 1972 and 1994.

Early life and career
Hines was born in Horsforth, a north-west suburb of Leeds in the West Riding of Yorkshire, the third son of Bill and Molly Hines. His mother was Scottish and came from Port Glasgow. Shortly after Hines was born, the family moved to Harrogate where his mother ran a boarding house.  As a child, Hines went to the Western Board Primary School and then Norwood College. Through his parents attending a local amateur dramatics group and regularly visiting the cinema, Hines discovered a love for performing and began attending the Margery Newbury School of Dancing every Saturday morning. It was here that during a performance aged seven at the Royal Hall in Harrogate that Hines sang the song Louise while doing an impersonation of Maurice Chevalier which generated newspaper headlines reading "A young star is born here tonight at the Royal Hall Harrogate".

Because of this success, Hines began attending Corona Theatre School in London where his fellow classmates included Richard O'Sullivan, Dennis Waterman, Jeremy Bulloch and Francesca Annis. Making his debut in the film John and Julie (1955) as an extra in a crowd scene, Hines went on to have minor roles in a number of films including  One Good Turn (1955) and The Woman for Joe (1955) before playing speaking parts in Moby Dick, The Weapon and X the Unknown (all 1956). Hines' breakthrough role however was in 1957 where he performed the role of Napoleon in a six-part television adaptation of John Buchan's 1922 novel Huntingtower. That same year, Hines appeared alongside Charlie Chaplin in the film A King in New York. From 1957 and throughout the 1960s, he performed a steady stream of roles in various television series, such as Jan in The Silver Sword (1957–58), Tim Birch in Emergency – Ward 10 (1963–64), and Roger Wain in Coronation Street (1965). He appeared in a 1964 serial, Smuggler's Bay, with Patrick Troughton.  With a well-established career in television, Hines appeared in feature films less frequently, however he did appear in Tunes of Glory (1960) with Alec Guinness, I Could Go On Singing (1963) with Judy Garland and the James Bond film You Only Live Twice (1967).

Doctor Who
Hines auditioned for the part of Ben Jackson in 1966 but was unsuccessful.

Hines' Doctor Who debut came in the same year, when he was cast to play the part of Jamie McCrimmon, the companion of the Second Doctor (played by Patrick Troughton). Originally intended as a one-off guest character, Jamie joined the regular cast and appeared in the series from 1966 to 1969. Hines reprised the role in a cameo in the 20th anniversary serial The Five Doctors (1983) and as a guest star in The Two Doctors (1985). Hines appeared in 117 episodes of Doctor Who in all—more than any other "companion" actor in the history of the series. The only actors appearing in more episodes are those who played the first four Doctors. Many of the episodes featuring Jamie no longer exist in the BBC's collection.

In 1968, during his third year on the show, Hines released with Major Minor Records the novelty record "Who's Dr. Who?" Esteemed songwriters Barry Mason and Les Reed composed the music and lyrics, but the record was a commercial failure. Hines later called it the only flop Mason and Reed ever wrote.

Hines and his fellow lead actors Patrick Troughton and Wendy Padbury (who played the Doctor's other companion Zoe Heriot) decided collectively that the workload of Doctor Who was exhausting them. Frazer was the first of the three to announce his intention to leave. Troughton asked him to stay a few more months, to the end of the sixth series, as this was when Troughton planned to relinquish his role. The three actors remained with the show until the conclusion of the final Season 6 serial The War Games (1969). In a documentary about Patrick Troughton, Hines reported that they all left with smiles on their faces, feeling that their job was done and that it was well done. Frazer attested that he remained in contact with Troughton afterward.

Author Diana Gabaldon credits watching Frazer Hines in the Doctor Who serial The War Games (and finding him attractive in a kilt) as the inspiration for her first novel, Outlander, a time travel story set in 18th century Scotland. Consequently, she named the novel's male protagonist Jamie. She says that the character's surname, Fraser, is a coincidence, as the PBS station on which she watched Doctor Who habitually cut off the episode's credits. She did not learn Hines' name until several years after Outlander was published.

Up until 2007, Hines was the only surviving Second Doctor companion actor not to have acted in a Big Finish Productions Doctor Who audio play. (The others have played characters other than their television roles.) In November 2007, he starred as Jamie in Helicon Prime, the second instalment in Season 2 of Big Finish's Companion Chronicles. Since then he has appeared in many more Companion Chronicles, where his uncanny ability to mimic Patrick Troughton's Second Doctor has been welcomed by fans of the show.  Hines has also recorded linking narration for many Second Doctor serials which no longer exist in video form; the soundtracks, along with Hines' narration, have been released on CD by BBC Audio. He also appeared in an audio trilogy with Colin Baker's Sixth Doctor as an older Jamie. In 2013, Hines portrayed both Jamie and the Second Doctor in the Big Finish audio play The Light at the End, produced to celebrate the 50th anniversary of Doctor Who.

Emmerdale
After his tenure as Jamie in Doctor Who, Hines resumed the life of a jobbing actor, appearing in several films such as The Last Valley and Zeppelin (both 1971), until 1972 when he was cast in the soap opera Emmerdale Farm as Joe Sugden, a role he played until 1994. In between making episodes of Emmerdale, as it was renamed in 1989, he has continued a career in the theatre and made occasional appearances in other TV shows. Hines was the subject of This Is Your Life in 1992 after Michael Aspel surprised him during the filming of Emmerdale. He stated in a 2019 interview, "I left Emmerdale because I got sick of going to work when it was dark and coming home when it was dark. I'd just got married and owned a stud farm, and so I said I would leave." He stated he was asked back to the show the following year but refused and was later killed off. Despite his off-screen death, Hines confirmed that he would like to return to the soap.

After Emmerdale
Straight out of Emmerdale, in 1995 Hines toured the UK in a production of Doctor in the House with Vicki Michelle, Robin Askwith and Windsor Davies. In 1998, he starred as Inspector Lord in a touring production of Spider's Web. Hines guest starred in an episode of Dalziel and Pascoe in 2006 and appeared with Kate O'Mara in a tour of The Hollow later that year. Hines appeared in Peter Kay's Comic Relief video of 2007, as one of the many guests dancing to the song I'm Gonna Be (500 Miles) by the Proclaimers. In 2011, he toured in the play Five Blue Haired Ladies Sitting on a Green Park Bench with Shirley Anne Field and Anita Harris. He appeared in the film A Voice to Die For in 2013. In 2014, Hines appeared in the film Two Days in the Smoke. He also appeared as Daddy Warbucks in the stage musical Annie in 2014.

Hines was cast in a 2015 episode of the television adaptation of Outlander, which he had helped to inspire. In the May 2015 episode "Wentworth Prison", Hines portrayed Sir Fletcher Gordon, an English prison warden. From 2016 to 2017, Hines starred as Albert Blunderstone in the tour of the play Seriously Dead.

In 2018, Hines starred in the award winning short film Sundown which was directed by Ryan Hendrick and also appeared in the sci-fi western film Blood Corral. In 2019, he starred in an audio film of Up Pompeii!, celebrating the fiftieth anniversary of the series, appearing alongside original cast members including Madeline Smith and Tim Brooke-Taylor. Hines appeared as Sonny Troughton, a former criminal, in two episodes of Doctors in 2020 and starred in the romantic-comedy film Lost at Christmas set in the Scottish Highlands later that same year.

Personal life
Hines has dated Jill Haworth, Pamela Franklin, Susan George, Liza Goddard and Deborah Watling. He also had a three-year relationship with Michael Caine's daughter Dominique. Hines has been twice married, first to Irish actress Gemma Craven from 1981 to 1984, and second to waterskiing champion Liz Hobbs (with whom he lived in Coddington, Nottinghamshire) from 1994 to 2003.

Boxtree, an imprint of Macmillan Publishers, published Hines' autobiography in 1996. This work, titled Films, Farms and Fillies, first appeared in a paperback edition. Thirteen years later, in December 2009, Telos Publishing released a revised hardcover edition, titled Hines Sight.

In July 2010, Hines disclosed that he suffered from colorectal cancer for eleven years, explaining that he kept his illness a secret for fear of professional alienation. Since his recovery, Hines has openly promoted cancer awareness through Cancer Research and the Bobby Moore Cancer Foundation. His older brother Roy Hines (1942–1982) was also an actor and died of cancer aged 40.

Hines later toured Northern England in a solo performance covering his career.

Hines is a member of the Grand Order of Water Rats.

Filmography

Film

Television

Music videos

References

External links

fan website
frazerhines.co.uk
Sundown (2018) Trailer

1944 births
English male film actors
English male television actors
English male voice actors
English male soap opera actors
20th-century English male actors
21st-century English male actors
English people of Scottish descent
Living people
People from Horsforth